Akhtar Chanal Zahri is a famous Pakistani Balochi folk singer. He is famous for his singing in Coke Studio (Pakistan).

Career
Akhtar Chanal Zahri was born at Khuzdar, Balochistan, Pakistan in 1954. In 1964, Akhtar Chanal started taking formal singing lessons from a music Ustad. In 1973, he brought regional folk to national attention after he was discovered by the Pakistan Broadcasting Corporation (PBC)'s Balochi Radio Station, and in 1974 Chanal's music became popular nationwide when his song Deer Deer was first aired live on national TV. Since then, Akhtar Chanal has traveled all over the world, including the United States, the Netherlands and Europe for tours. He has performed in a concert arranged at the Shanghai Cooperation Organisation for the political leaders meeting at the summit. Former Prime Minister of Pakistan Benazir Bhutto took him on a tour to England. When Atal Bihari Vajpayee visited Islamabad, Pakistan, he performed then at an event in 2004.

Akhtar Chanal Zahri reportedly has said in an interview, "The songs I hummed as a youngster watching my sheep, are embedded in my memory. Where I come from, when a child is born, the only two things he knows how to do are sing and cry – music is part of us from the very beginning".

Songs 
Some of his famous songs are:
 Daanah Pah Daanah
 Da sande Zehri 
 Baloch
 Nar Bait
 Afghan Jalebi (Doumbek Version) from Phantom (2015 film)
 Shonk O Bijili
 Je aoo patari

Filmography
Mirzya (film) - a 2016 Bollywood film

Awards and recognition
Pride of Performance Award by the President of Pakistan in 1998.

References

External links
 
 Coke Studio: Season 7 artists

Pakistani folk singers
Living people
People from Balochistan, Pakistan
Brahui people
Baloch male singers
1954 births
Coke Studio (Pakistani TV program)
Recipients of the Pride of Performance